Court Street Station may refer to:

 Court Street station (Boston), a former Blue Line station
 Court Street station (Cincinnati), a former train station, now a Greyhound terminal
 Court Street station (Rochester), a former rapid transit station in New York state
 Court Street (IND Fulton Street Line station), a former subway station in Brooklyn, now the site of the New York Transit Museum
 Court Street – Borough Hall (New York City Subway), a subway station in Brooklyn, New York
 Court Street – Myrtle Avenue (New York City Subway), a former subway station in Brooklyn, New York on the demolished Fulton Street Elevated